Shakeel Khan (born 22 December 1952) is a Pakistani former first-class cricketer and umpire. He stood in six Test matches between 1983 and 2002 and 16 ODI games between 1982 and 1996.

See also
 List of Test cricket umpires
 List of One Day International cricket umpires

References

External links

1952 births
Living people
Cricketers from Karachi
Pakistani Test cricket umpires
Pakistani One Day International cricket umpires
Pakistani cricketers
Karachi Whites cricketers
Karachi Blues cricketers
Pakistan Railways cricketers
National Bank of Pakistan cricketers
Karachi Greens cricketers
National Bank of Pakistan B cricketers